Ellen Maureen "Lynn" Schindler (August 18, 1944 – December 4, 2018) was an American politician from Washington. Schindler was a Republican member of Washington House of Representatives from District 4 from 1998 to 2009.

Early life 
On August 18, 1944, Schindler was born 
as Ellen Maureen Dunphy in Milwaukee, Wisconsin. Schindler's parents were Ellen and Ward Dunphy.

Education 
In 1966, Schindler earned a Bachelor of Arts degree in Communications from Marquette University.

Career 
As a businesswoman, Schindler was a co-owner of Schindler Electric Supply Co. Schindler was involved in commercial and investment properties with her husband.

In June 1998, Schindler was appointed as a member of Washington House of Representatives for District 4.

On November 3, 1998, Schindler won the election and continued serving as a Republican member of Washington House of Representatives for District 4, Position 2. Schindler defeated John G. Kallas with 55.83% of the votes.

On November 7, 2000, as an incumbent. Schindler won the election and continued serving Washington House of Representatives for District 4, Position 2. Schindler defeated John G. Kallas with 60.30% of the votes.

On November 5, 2002, as an incumbent. Schindler won the election unopposed and continued serving Washington House of Representatives for District 4, Position 2.

On November 2, 2004, as an incumbent. Schindler won the election and continued serving Washington House of Representatives for District 4, Position 2. Schindler defeated Ed Foote with 65.85% of the votes.

On November 7, 2006, as an incumbent. Schindler won the election and continued serving Washington House of Representatives for District 4, Position 2. Schindler defeated Ed Foote with 65.05% of the votes.

Personal life 
Schindler was married to Jim Schindler. They had ten children. In 1995, Schindler's son Patrick died in a car accident. On December 4, 2018, Schindler died in Spokane Valley, Washington. Schindler is interred at St. Michael Cemetery.

References

External links 
 Lynn Schindler at ourcampaigns.com
 Lynn Schindler at washingtonvotes.org

1944 births
2018 deaths
Politicians from Milwaukee
Marquette University alumni
Businesspeople from Washington (state)
Women state legislators in Washington (state)
Republican Party members of the Washington House of Representatives
20th-century American businesspeople
20th-century American women
21st-century American women